CD-47 was a C Type class escort ship (Kaibōkan) of the Imperial Japanese Navy during the Second World War.

History
She was laid down by Nippon Kokan K.K. (日本鋼管株式會社) at their Tsurumi, Yokohama shipyard on 15 July 1944, launched on 29 September 1944, and completed and commissioned on 2 November 1944. She was attached to the Yokosuka Defense Force, Yokosuka Naval District under Lieutenant Commander Fukuji Chiba. During the war CD-47 was mostly busy on escort duties mainly to the Ogasawara Islands and the Kurile Islands.

Convoy-Chi
On 29 May 1945 at 2055, the U.S. submarine  fired two spreads of three torpedoes hitting two of the freighters. Tenryo Maru quickly sank at  killing 773 out of 947 men of the 23rd Air Defense Battalion, 26 gunners, and 83 sailors. Sterlet also severely damaged Kuretake Maru which sank the following day with a death toll of 272 soldiers and six sailors.

Fate
On 15 July 1945, off Otaru, she was damaged along with CD-55 and  Kasado by U.S. Navy planes from Task Force 38. 

On 15 November 1945, she was struck from the Navy List.

References

Additional sources

1944 ships
Ships built in Japan
Type C escort ships
Maritime incidents in August 1945
World War II shipwrecks in the Sea of Japan